Chocas Mar is a long pristine beach in Nampula Province in Mozambique.  It is about 40km north of the Island of Mozambique across the Mossuril Bay.  There are a couple of accommodation options in the area, including Complexo Namarralo.  Chocas Mar is accessible either by unpaved road or boat.

Also nearby is the town of Cabaceira that has a restaurant, a beautiful old church and the ruins of a Governor's house.

External links
https://web.archive.org/web/20080213221545/http://www.ofroadandsea.com/sector6/general_information.php

Beaches of Mozambique
Geography of Nampula Province
Tourist attractions in Nampula Province